Macduff (Banff) railway station served the town of Macduff, Aberdeenshire, Scotland, from 1860 to 1872 on the Banff, Macduff and Turriff Junction Railway.

History 
The station opened as Banff and Macduff on 4 June 1860 by the Great North of Scotland Railway. To the south was the goods yard and to the north was a locomotive shed. The station's name was changed to Macduff (Banff) in 1866. The location wasn't ideal because it was situated a mile away from Macduff so it closed on 1 July 1872.

References

External links 

Disused railway stations in Aberdeenshire
Former Great North of Scotland Railway stations
Railway stations in Great Britain opened in 1860
Railway stations in Great Britain closed in 1872
1860 establishments in Scotland
1872 disestablishments in Scotland